Juraj Hovančík (born 22 November 1990) is a Slovak football midfielder who currently plays for Odeva Lipany.

Career statistics

External links
 Futbalnet profile
 MFK Košice profile
 

1990 births
Living people
Sportspeople from Prešov
Association football midfielders
Slovak footballers
FC VSS Košice players
FK Železiarne Podbrezová players
1. FC Tatran Prešov players
FC Lokomotíva Košice players
ŠK Odeva Lipany players
Slovak Super Liga players
2. Liga (Slovakia) players
3. Liga (Slovakia) players